Nizāmuddīn Asīr Adrawi (also known as Asīr Adrawi; 1926 – 20 May 2021) was an Indian Sunni Muslim scholar, biographer, historian and author in the Urdu language. He established Madrassa Darus Salam in Adari and served as Officer In Charge of Jamiat Ulama-e-Hind in Lucknow from 1974 to 1978. 

Asīr was an alumnus  of Jamia Miftahul Uloom, Madrassa Ehya-ul-Uloom and the Madrasa Shahi. He taught Islamic sciences at the Madrasa Jamia Islamia in Rewri Talab, Varanasi. His works include Maʼās̲ir-i Shaik̲h̲ulislām, Tafāsīr mai Isrā'īli Riwāyāt and the biographies of Hussain Ahmad Madani, Imamuddin Punjabi, Muhammad Qasim Nanautawi, Mahmud Hasan Deobandi and Rashid Ahmad Gangohi.

Biography
Nizamuddin Asir Adrawi was born in 1926 in Adari, Mau, then in the United Provinces of British India. He was schooled at Madrasa Faydh al-Ghuraba, in Adari, and then at the Jamia Miftahul Uloom where studied with Habib Al-Rahman Al-Azmi, Munshi Zahīr-ul-Haq Nishāt Simābi and Abdul Latīf Nomāni. He then went to Madrassa Ehya-ul-Uloom in Mubarakpur, where he studied with scholars such as  Shukrullah Mubarakpuri. He then moved to Darul Uloom Mau where he studied Mishkat with Abdur Rasheed al-Hussayni and Jalalayn with Qari Riyasat Ali. He applied for admission to Darul Uloom Deoband but was unsuccessful and thus went to Madrasa Shahi for higher studies and graduated in 1942. He studied Sahih Bukhari with Syed Fakhruddin Ahmad, Sahih Muslim with Ismail Sambhali and Tirmidhi with Muhammad Miyan Deobandi.

Asīr participated in the Quit India Movement. He was associated with the Indian National Congress until 1948, when he joined the Congress Socialist Party. He established Madrassa Darus Salam in Adri, Mau in 1954, and taught in Adri for around sixteen years.He served as Officer In Charge of Jamiat Ulama-e-Hind, Uttar Pradesh in Lucknow from 1974 to 1978 and thereafter taught Islamic Sciences at the Madrasa Jamia Islamia in Rewri Talab, Varanasi from 4 February 1978 till he was bedridden due to senescence.

Asīr was the editor of 3 monthly Tarjumān and wrote hundreds of articles for it. He was a columnist and a writer for the Weekly Al-Jamiat and Daily al-Jamiat of Jamiat Ulama-e-Hind. He wrote short stories and legends including Itnā, Do LāsheiN, Nashīb-o-Farāz and Aetirāf-e-Shikast. His legends such as Hand bag and Aspatāl were published in the Nawai Pakistan, Lahore. He also contributed to the Kāmyāb, Delhi and the Risālā Dārul Uloom of the Darul Uloom Deoband. Several of his works have been considered primary sources for various Darul Uloom Deoband related issues.

Asīr died on 20 May 2021 in Adari, Mau, Uttar Pradesh. Arshad Madani expressed grief on his death and said that "Asīr Adrawi's death is an irreparable loss."

Literary works
Asīr wrote biographies of Muhammad Qasim Nanautavi, Mahmud Hasan Deobandi, Imamuddin Punjabi, Rahmatullah Kairanawi, Rashid Ahmad Gangohi and Hussain Ahmed Madani. He abridged the four-volume Tarīkh-e-Islām of Muinuddin Ahmad Nadwi into four thin volumes. His book Taḥrīk-i āzādī aur Musalmān is part of the curricula of the Darul Uloom Deoband and several other affiliated madrasas. His other books include:
 Afkār-e-Aalam
 Dabistān-i Devband kī ʻilmī k̲h̲idmāt
 Dārulʻulūm Devband, iḥyā-yi Islām kī ʻaẓīm taḥrīk
 Fun asma-ur-Rijal
 Maʼās̲ir-i Shaik̲h̲ulislām (Biography of Hussain Ahmed Madani)
 Tafāsīr mai Isrā'īli Riwāyāt
 Tārīkh Jamiat Ulema-e-Hind
 Tārīkh-e-Tabri ka tehqīqi jayzah
 Urdu sharah Dīvān-i Mutanabbī

References

1926 births
2021 deaths
Scholars from Uttar Pradesh
Indian Islamic studies scholars
Indian Sunni Muslim scholars of Islam
Deobandis
Sunni Muslim scholars of Islam
20th-century Indian historians
Indian historians of Islam
Madrasa Shahi alumni
People from Mau district
Students of Muhammad Miyan Deobandi